Karl Ferdinand Sohn (10 December 1805 in Berlin – 25 November 1867 in Cologne) was a German painter of the Düsseldorf school of painting.

Biography

He was born in Berlin and started his studies at the age of eighteen under Wilhelm von Schadow, whom he followed to Düsseldorf. He focused on mythical and poetic subjects of a highly romantic character, and painted in the idealistic manner of the Düsseldorf school.

He visited Italy (1830–1831) and adopted ideas from the works of the Venetians; Titian, Paolo Veronese, and Palma il Vecchio. In 1832, he was named a Professor at the Düsseldorf Academy, where he exercised an important influence.

On 18 January 1834, he married Emilie Auguste von Mülmann in Düsseldorf. They had five children. His two sons Paul Eduard Richard Sohn (1834–1912) and Karl Friedrich Rudolf Sohn (1845–1908) also grew up to be painters. The latter married Else Sohn-Rethel (1853–1933), daughter of the painter Alfred Rethel. Clara, his eldest daughter, was married to the German composer and conductor Albert Dietrich. His daughter Marie married the painter Karl Hoff (1838–1890). His youngest daughter, Emilie, married his nephew, the painter Wilhelm Sohn (1830–1899), thereby making him his nephew and son-in-law.

Later, He painted biblical subjects, and then devoted himself to genre scenes, well characterized and of great coloristic charm. Among these are: the  Consultation at the Lawyer's (1866, Leipzig Museum) and the Warrior of the Seventeenth Century (1869, Dresden Gallery).

At the age of nearly sixty-two Karl Ferdinand Sohn died on 25 November 1867 during a visit to his friend Ferdinand Hiller in Cologne.

Notable students

 Anselm Feuerbach
 Marie Wiegmann
 Amalie Bensinger
 Elisabeth Jerichau-Baumann
 Heinrich Ludwig Philippi
 Clemens Bewer
 Ludwig von Milewski

Selected paintings

External links 

 PhD project to Carl Ferdinand Sohn

Sources
 
 This article incorporates text from a publication now in the public domain: Gilman, D. C.; Peck, H. T.; Colby, F. M., eds. (1905). New International Encyclopedia (1st ed.). New York: Dodd, Mead.

19th-century German painters
19th-century German male artists
German male painters
1805 births
1867 deaths
Academic staff of Kunstakademie Düsseldorf
Düsseldorf school of painting